Are Hansen  (born 16 January 1982) is a Norwegian sport shooter. He competed at the 2012 Summer Olympics in the Men's 10 metre air rifle and Men's 50 metre rifle 3 positions events.  At the 2008 Summer Olympics, he competed in the Men's 10 metre air rifle event only.

References

Norwegian male sport shooters
1982 births
Living people
Olympic shooters of Norway
Shooters at the 2008 Summer Olympics
Shooters at the 2012 Summer Olympics
Shooters at the 2016 Summer Olympics
European Games competitors for Norway
Shooters at the 2015 European Games
21st-century Norwegian people